Čeplak or Ceplák is a surname. Notable people with the surname include:

 Jolanda Čeplak (born 1976), Slovene middle-distance runner
 Miroslav Ceplák (born 1983), Czech footballer

See also
 

Slavic-language surnames